The 15th Golden Globe Awards, honoring the best in film for 1957 films, were held on February 22, 1958.

Film

Best Film - Drama
 The Bridge on the River Kwai
Wild is the Wind 
Sayonara
12 Angry Men 
Witness for the Prosecution

Best Film - Comedy or Musical
 Les Girls
Don't Go Near the Water
Love in the Afternoon
Pal Joey
Silk Stockings

Best Actor - Drama
 Alec Guinness - The Bridge on the River Kwai
Marlon Brando - Sayonara
Henry Fonda - 12 Angry Men
Anthony Franciosa - A Hatful of Rain
Charles Laughton - Witness for the Prosecution

Best Actress - Drama
Joanne Woodward - The Three Faces of Eve'''
Marlene Dietrich - Witness for the Prosecution
Deborah Kerr - Heaven Knows, Mr. Allison
Anna Magnani - Wild Is the Wind
Eva Marie Saint - A Hatful of Rain

Best Actor - Comedy or Musical
Frank Sinatra - Pal Joey
Maurice Chevalier - Love in the Afternoon
Glenn Ford - Don't Go Near the Water
David Niven - My Man Godfrey
Tony Randall - Will Success Spoil Rock Hunter?

Best Actress - Comedy or Musical
Taina Elg - Les Girls
Kay Kendall - Les Girls
Cyd Charisse - Silk Stockings
Audrey Hepburn - Love in the Afternoon
Jean Simmons - This Could Be the Night

Best Supporting Actor
Red Buttons - Sayonara
Lee J. Cobb - 12 Angry Men
Sessue Hayakawa - The Bridge on the River Kwai
Nigel Patrick - Raintree County
Ed Wynn - The Great Man

Best Supporting Actress
Elsa Lanchester - Witness for the Prosecution
Mildred Dunnock - Peyton Place
Hope Lange - Peyton Place
Heather Sears - The Story of Esther Costello
Miyoshi Umeki - Sayonara

Best Director
David Lean - The Bridge on the River Kwai
Joshua Logan - Sayonara
Sidney Lumet - 12 Angry Men
Billy Wilder - Witness for the Prosecution
Fred Zinnemann - A Hatful of Rain

Best Foreign Language Film
 Confessions of Felix Krull (West Germany)
 Tizoc (Mexico)
 Woman in a Dressing Gown (United Kingdom)
 Yellow Crow (Kiiroi karasu) (Japan)

Best Film Promoting International Understanding
 The Happy Road

Henrietta Award (World Film Favorites)
Tony Curtis
Doris Day

Special Achievement Award
Hugo Friedhofer
Zsa Zsa Gabor
Bob Hope
LeRoy Prinz
Jean Simmons

Television

Best TV Show
The Mickey Mouse Club

Television Achievement
Jack Benny
Eddie Fisher
Alfred Hitchcock
Mike Wallace

New Star of the Year - Actor
James Garner
John Saxon
Patrick Wayne

New Star of the Year - Actress
Sandra Dee
Carolyn Jones
Diane Varsi

Cecil B. DeMille Award
Buddy Adler

References
IMdb 1958 Golden Globe Awards 

014
1957 film awards
1957 television awards
1957 awards in the United States
February 1958 events in the United States